Thermos bomb was the informal name for the AR-4, an air dropped anti-personnel mine used by the Italian Air Force during World War II. Large numbers were used against Malta and in the Middle East. It was named for its superficial appearance to a Thermos bottle, a popular brand of vacuum flask. It could be fitted with a very sensitive motion-sensitive fuze that would detonate if any attempt was made to move it. Because of this, unexploded Thermos bombs were normally destroyed where they fell, either by attaching a long piece of string to them and giving it a jerk, or detonating a small explosive charge near them.

A later variant of the fuze introduced a long time delay, which triggered between 60 and 80 hours after the fuze had armed.

References
 

Area denial weapons
Anti-personnel weapons
Italian inventions
World War II aerial bombs of Italy
Military equipment introduced from 1940 to 1944